Dorji is a Tibetan and Bhutanese given name and surname.

Dorji or Dorjee may also refer to:

Given name
Dorji Choden (born 1960), Bhutanese politician
Dorji Dema (born 1983), Bhutanese archer
Dorjee Khandu (1955–2011), Indian politician 
Dorji Namgyal, Bhutanese politician
Dorjee Sun (born 1977), social entrepreneur and LGBT rights activist based in Singapore 
Jigme Dorji Wangchuck (1929–1972), Bhutanese monarch
Jigme Dorji National Park 
Jigme Dorji Wangchuck (born 1986), Prince of Bhutan
Dorji Wangchuk (born 1967), Bhutanese Tibetologist
Dorji Wangdi, Bhutanese politician 
Dorji Wangmo (born 1955), Bhutanese royalty
Dorji Yangki, Bhutanese architect

Surname
Ap Chuni Dorji, Bhutanese poet 
Chenkyab Dorji, Bhutanese diplomat
Chimi Dorji (born 1993), Bhutanese footballer
Damcho Dorji (born 1965), Bhutanese politician 
Dorji family, a Bhutanese political family 
Hans Dorjee (1941–2002), Dutch football player and manager 
Jigme Palden Dorji (1919–1964), Bhutanese politician, member of the Dorji family
Jigme Tshering Dorji (born 1995), Bhutanese footballer
Kazi Lhendup Dorjee (1904–2007), Indian politician
Kelly Dorji, Bhutanese actor and model 
Kezang Dorji (born 1989), Bhutanese rapper and social worker
Kinley Dorji, Bhutanese ministry official
Kinley Dorji (footballer), Bhutanese footballer
Kinzang Dorji (born 1951), Prime Minister of Bhutan 
Lam Dorji (born 1933), Chief Operations Officer of the Royal Bhutan Army 
Lama Dorji (1728–1753), ruler of the Dzungar Khanate
Lhendup Dorji (1935–2007), Prime Minister of Bhutan, member of the Dorji family 
Lhendup Dorji (footballer), Bhutanese footballer 
Mayeum Choying Wangmo Dorji, Bhutanese royalty 
Nim Dorjee Tamang (born 1995), Indian footballer
Pasang Dorjee Sona, Indian politician 
Pawo Choyning Dorji (born 1983), Bhutanese filmmaker and photographer
Pem Dorjee Sherpa (born 1982), Nepalese Sherpa mountaineer 
Pema Dorji (doctor) (1936–2009), Bhutanese doctor 
Pema Dorji (footballer) (born 1985), Bhutanese football manager
Phu Dorjee, Indian sherpa 
Rinzin Dorji (athlete) (born 1976), Bhutanese runner 
Sonam Topgay Dorji (1896–1953), Prime Minister of Bhutan, member of the Dorji family
Tenzin Dorji (1997), Bhutanese footballer
Thinley Dorji (born 1995), Bhutanese footballer
Thinley Dorji (archer) (born 1950), Bhutanese archer 
Tsering Dorjee, Tibetan stage and film actor, singer, dancer and musician 
Tshering Dorji (born 1993), Bhutanese footballer
Tseten Dorjee (born 1960), Tibetan painter
Tsewang Dorji Namjal (1732–1750), ruler of the Dzungar Khanate
Ugyen Dorji (1855–1916), Prime Minister of Bhutan, member of the Dorji family
Ugyen Dorji (footballer), Bhutanese footballer 
Wangay Dorji (born 1974), Bhutanese football player 
Yeshe Dorjee Thongchi (born 1952), Indian writer
Yeshey Dorji (born 1989), Bhutanese footballer

Tibetan names